Father Nicholas Sheehy (1728–1766) was an 18th-century Irish Roman Catholic priest who was executed on the charge of accessory to murder. Father Sheehy was a prominent and vocal opponent of the Penal Laws, which disenfranchised and persecuted Catholics in Ireland. His conviction is widely regarded as an act of judicial murder amongst supporters of the Irish rebellion.

Background
During this time, famine caused much suffering and death in Ireland. Adding to the social unrest was a rumour that the Catholic French would invade Ireland. Part of this concern stemmed from the emigration of Irish soldiers who had left for France after the Treaty of Limerick known as the Flight of the Wild Geese. The concern was that these Irish would lobby the French monarch to support the Catholics in Ireland. This led to new persecutions of Catholic Irish and their priests.

Family 
Nicholas Sheehy was born in Fethard, Ireland, near Clonmel and grew up in a house near Newcastle on the Tipperary and Waterford border. His father was Francis, son of John of Drumcollogher.

Nicholas Sheehy had a sister, Mrs Green. Nicholas had a cousin (Edmund Buck), who was hanged in 1775 at Clogheen on the same charges.

Education, career and opposition to Penal Laws 
Nicholas Sheehy was possibly educated in France. His training for the priesthood was at the Irish College at Salamanca. and was ordained in 1750. Following a period as curate at Newcastle, County Tipperary, he became the parish priest for Shanrahan, Ballysheehan, and Templetenny, County Tipperary. Sheehy spoke out against the Penal Laws, the eviction of poor tenants by Anglo-Irish landlords, the elimination of common land by enclosure, and compulsory tithes. These tithes were due to the Protestant Church of Ireland and its clergy. To anyone who would not or could not pay, the tithes were often seized by force and given to the local Protestant minister.

Between 1735 and 1760 there was an increase in land used for grazing and beef cattle, in part because pasture land was exempt from tithes. The landlords, having let their lands far above their value, on condition of allowing the tenants the use of certain commons, now enclosed the commons, but did not lessen the rent. As more landlords and farmers switched to raising cattle, labourers and small tenant farmers were forced off the land. In response, the Whiteboys developed as a secret society among the peasantry. Initially, their activities were limited to specific grievances and the tactics used non-violent, such as knocking down fences, and the levelling of ditches that closed off common grazing land, but as their numbers increased, so did the violence. Their actions were not specifically political as it was not directed against the government, but against the local landlords. Members of different religious affiliations took part. Sheehy raised money for the defence of those accused of rioting.

Accusations and trials

First trial (sedition)
Sheehy's beliefs led him into conflict with local Protestant leaders around Clonmel. He was arrested for sedition for his supposed involvement in the Whiteboy's destruction of a wall intended to close off common land near Clogheen. After a trial in Dublin he was acquitted.

Second trial (high treason)
Following his acquittal, Sheehy was accused of involvement in the disappearance or murder of an informer, John Bridge. Sheehy went into hiding. In 1764, the government issued a Proclamation and offered £300 reward for the capture of Sheehy. Sheehy wrote to Thomas Waite (Under-Secretary for Ireland) offering to surrender if he would be tried in Dublin. The offer was accepted and the trial took place on 10 February 1766, when he was acquitted of High Treason. Immediately after his acquittal, Sheehy was charged with the murder of John Bridges, although no body had been found.

Third trial (accessory to murder) and death sentence 
On 12 March 1766, Sheehy was tried at Clonmel Main Guard for being an accessory in the murder of John Bridge. The judge Richard Clayton had the reputation of an honest and humane man, but he had arrived in Ireland only the previous year and seems to have been quite unaware of the political background to the trial.

Many of the witnesses who had previously testified against Sheehy also testified in this trial, in addition to Mrs. Mary Brady (Moll Dunlea), an "abandoned character". The evidence was widely considered as fabricated by local Anglo-Irish landowners and the Anglican Vicar of Clogheen in south County Tipperary.

Evidence was presented in favour of Sheehy, that he was "a respectable man and a man of property" by a Mr Keating, who said that Father Sheehy was in his house at the time of the murder. Mr Keating's testimony was dismissed in court by a Protestant clergyman (Mr Hewitson), who declared Keating was unreliable. Mr Keating was then arrested and sent to Kilkenny Gaol based on Mr Hewitson's allegations to frustrate his giving evidence. Although the judge was later much criticised for his conduct of the trial, it has been argued that his summing up was actually favourable to the accused.

Sheehy was convicted and sentenced to be hanged, drawn and quartered. He asserted his innocence before his death of all the charges made against him. He said in his final speech, after being sentenced to death, that he was being put to death for a crime which had never been committed; the murder victim (John Bridge) was alleged to be in Cork after the date of the "crime" and it is thought that he emigrated to Newfoundland.

Sheehy's attorney, on hearing the sentence of death, said to the judge, magistrates and jurors, "If there is any justice in heaven, you will die roaring.".

Execution 
In 1766, Sheehy was hanged at Clonmel on 15 March 1766. Others accused were also convicted for the murder of John Bridge and executed (3 May 1766), including Edmond Sheehy, cousin of the priest, and Ned Meehan, a prominent Catholic farmer who refused to bear witness against Sheehy when offered his liberty in prison. Sheehy was hanged on a scaffold in Clonmel opposite St. Peters and Paul's Church, where there was a plaque to commemorate his death. His head was severed and stuck on a spike over Clonmel Gaol as a warning against agrarian violence and remained above the porch at Clonmel jail for ten years.

His sister, Catherine Sheehy Burke (whose husband Richard was cousin to Edmund Burke), eventually obtained her brother's body, and had him buried in the graveyard at Shanrahan.

Legacy 
To this day, Father Sheehy is regarded as a martyr. In the late 19th century and early 20th century, there was an effort to have him canonised, which reportedly was dropped after the records collected for his cause were destroyed in a fire.

His trial and execution inflamed and polarised nationalist opinion, and had a great effect on his cousin Edmund Burke.

People visited his grave at Shanrahan cemetery near Clogheen to take clay, because it was rumoured to have healing powers. It is claimed that out of respect, birds didn't peck his head for the ten years it was left on the spike.

Notes

External links 
 'The Case of Fr. Nicholas Sheehy. Priest - Patriot - Martyr'
 A photo of Nicholas Sheehy's grave

1728 births
1766 deaths
18th-century Roman Catholic martyrs
Irish land reform activists
Irish rebels
18th-century Irish Roman Catholic priests
Executed Roman Catholic priests
People from County Tipperary
Executed Irish people
People executed by the Kingdom of Great Britain
Deaths by hanging